Fischbach/Rhön is a village and a former municipality in the Schmalkalden-Meiningen district of Thuringia, Germany. Since 31 December 2013, it is part of the town Kaltennordheim.

References

Rhön Mountains
Former municipalities in Thuringia